The Spyker C8 is a sports car produced by the Dutch automaker Spyker Cars since 2000. The design takes visual cues from the 1999 Spyker Silvestris V8 concept car but the proportions have been changed vastly.

First generation (2000–2012)

Spyder (2000–2009) 
The Spyder (later known as the Spyder SWB to distinguish it from Spyker's long-wheelbase offerings) is the original base model of the C8, debuting at the 2000 Birmingham Motor Show.

Laviolette (2001–2009) 
The Laviolette was the second C8 model to be developed, and was unveiled by Spyker at AutoRAI 2001. The Laviolette has the same Audi 4.2L V8 engine producing  as the Spyder, but replaces the Spyder's retractable soft top roof with a fixed glass canopy and an integrated roof air intake, making it the first C8 coupe. 55 Laviolettes were built in total.

The name 'Laviolette' is a reference to Belgian engineer Joseph Valentin Laviolette, who helped develop several Spyker race cars in the early 1900s.

Double 12S (2002–2007) 
The next year, Spyker commemorated the opening of a new factory with the unveiling of the Double 12S on March 21, 2002. The Double 12S is a road-legal version of the Double 12R race car, and as such uses the same modified 4.0L Audi V8. The Double 12S was offered in five different stages of tune, listed below:

The name 'Double 12' is a reference to the 24-hour world speed record, set in 1922 by racing driver Selwyn Edge in a Spyker C4.

Spyder T (2003–2007) 
The Spyder T is a modified version of the original C8 Spyder. To handle the new powertrain, the Spyder T features a wider track and tires over the standard Spyder, as well as suspension and aerodynamic upgrades.

Laviolette LWB (2008–2012) 
At the 2008 Geneva Motor Show, Spyker introduced a long-wheelbase C8 Laviolette to be produced alongside the original standard-wheelbase car. The Laviolette LWB uses the same Audi 4.2L V8 from the original Laviolette, producing .

Laviolette LM85 (2009–2012) 
The Laviolette LM85 is a road-legal version of the Laviolette GT2-R racing car, much like the Double 12S was to the Double 12R. Production of the LM85 was limited to 24 units to pay homage to the 24 Hours of Le Mans races in which many Spyker race cars have taken part. The Laviolette LM85 was designed after the GT2-R's racing livery, and only offered in a two-tone Burnt Orange/Gun Metal finish. The car utilized the 4.2L Audi V8, producing .

The 'LM85' name is a combination of the acronym for 'Le Mans' (LM) and the number 85, Spyker Squadron's preferred racing number.

Second generation (2009–2018)

Aileron (2009–2016) 

At the 2009 Geneva Motor Show, Spyker debuted the C8 Aileron, described by the company as the second generation of their C8 sports car, to replace the Laviolette. Though still equipped with the same 4.2L Audi V8 from the Spyder and Laviolette, the Aileron features a longer, wider body, and, for the first time in the C8, an optional ZF automatic transmission. Continuing with the aviation themes of previous C8 cars, the Aileron's wheel design is inspired by jet turbine blades, a motif that can be seen throughout the car's aluminum construction and interior.

The name 'Aileron' is a reference to the flight control surface of the same name, a nod to the company's history in aviation.

Aileron Spyder (2009–2016) 
A convertible version of the C8 Aileron was unveiled later in 2009 at the Pebble Beach Concours d'Elegance. Aside from the retractable roof, the dimensions and powertrain of the Aileron Spyder are identical to those of the standard Aileron. The Aileron Spyder would replace the original C8 Spyder, which had been in production since 2000.

Aileron LM85 (2018) 
To commemorate the end of the production of C8 Aileron models with the introduction of the Preliator, Spyker built three Aileron LM85 cars. As with the previous Laviolette LM85s, the Aileron LM85s are styled after the Spyker racing livery, though each of the three Aileron LM85 examples produced came with a distinct color scheme. The LM85 is the only Aileron model to feature Spyker's more powerful 4.2L supercharged Audi V8 producing .

Third generation (2016–present)

Preliator (2016–present) 

The C8 Preliator was officially announced at the 2016 Geneva Motor Show as the third generation C8 sportscar, replacing the Aileron. Though originally Spyker had planned to produce the Preliator with a 5.0L V8 engine supplied by Koenigsegg, in 2018 this deal was called off. The car comes with a choice of a 6-speed Getrag manual or a 6 speed ZF automatic transmission. As with previous Spyker models, the car has typical aviation inspired design elements such as NACA styled air-inlets. Driver technology has been upgraded as well compared to previous models, with the C8 Preliator gaining a heads-up display and bluetooth connectivity for phones.

The name 'Preliator' likely comes from the Latin word proeliator, meaning "fighter".

Preliator Spyder (2017–present) 
The following year at the 2017 Geneva Motor Show, Spyker unveiled the Preliator Spyder to replace the outgoing Aileron Spyder model. Though introduced with the Koenigsegg V8 producing , due to the termination of the engine deal the Spyder will also use the Preliator's 4.2L supercharged Audi V8.

Racing

Double 12R (2001–2003) 
The Double 12R was a version of the C8 developed specifically for the 24 hours of Le Mans, using a Mader BMW V8 racing engine with a displacement of 4.0L and power output of .https://www.raceart.eu/en/our-collection/spyker-c8-double-12-r The Double 12R debuted shortly after the Laviolette at the 2001 IAA in Frankfurt. The Double 12R's first race was the 2002 12 Hours of Sebring, though an accident prevented the car from finishing. It also participated in the 2003 24 Hours of Le Mans and several other endurance races.

Spyder GT2-R (2005–2008) 
The Spyder GT2-R represented Spyker's next generation of racing car, succeeding the Double 12R in 2005 in its debut at the 12 Hours of Sebring.  The GT2-R featured a racing version of the road car's V8, now displacing 3.8L and producing .

Laviolette GT2-R (2008–2010) 
Spyker followed the introduction of the Laviolette LWB in 2008 with a replacement for the Spyder GT2-R race car. The Laviolette GT2-R debuted at the 2008 24 Hours of Le Mans with a 4.0L V8 version of the engine seen previously in the Spyder GT2-R.

Specifications

Chassis 
Every incarnation of the C8 from the Spyder to the Preliator is built on an aluminum spaceframe chassis, although through the generations the original chassis has been stiffened and lengthened to accommodate the longer wheelbase and optional automatic transmission. The body panels for the first two C8 generations are also made out of aluminum, while the Preliator incorporates carbon fibre for all parts of the body except the hood and the deck for additional weight savings over the outgoing Aileron.

Suspension 
All generations of C8 come equipped with double wishbone suspension at the front and rear axles. First generation C8 models used inboard Koni shock absorbers and components constructed from stainless steel and aluminum. Aileron and Preliator models adopted an updated suspension setup developed by Lotus, with an increase number of parts manufactured from forged aluminum and new mono-tube dampers.

Wheels

Powertrains and performance

In popular culture
A C8 Spyder appeared in Season 4 episode 7 of Top Gear (UK) driven by Jeremy Clarkson and The Stig.

The Spyker C8 Laviolette has been featured in movies such as Basic Instinct 2, War and Fast & Furious 6. It also appeared in "Rizzoli & Isles" Money for Nothing episode. The Spyker C8 was also featured in a 2010 commercial for Reese's Puffs.

The C8 has also been featured in a number of video games, including:

Gallery

References

External links

Spyker Cars (official website)(down)
(owner and enthusiast website)

Rear mid-engine, rear-wheel-drive vehicles
Sports cars
C8
Convertibles
Hardtop convertibles
Coupés
Cars introduced in 2000
24 Hours of Le Mans race cars